Ratna Mandir is a former palace used by the Nepalese royal family.

It is located near the Phewa Lake in Pokhara, Gandaki Province, Nepal. Ratna Mandir was built in 1956 by King Mahendra for his wife Ratna, and the palace is spread over 56,468 square meters.

References 

Buildings and structures in Pokhara
Palaces in Nepal
Royal residences in Nepal
Tourist attractions in Gandaki Province
Shah palaces of Nepal
1956 establishments in Nepal